Lagonegro Cathedral is a Roman Catholic cathedral dedicated to Saint Nicholas located in the comune of Lagonegro in Basilicata, southern Italy. Since 1976 it has been a co-cathedral of the Roman Catholic Diocese of Tursi-Lagonegro.

History
The church was built in the 9th and 10th centuries, but has been renovated many times since. The interior is very spacious and heterogenous, owing to several expansions. Treasures include a crucifix by Altobello Persio, a depiction of Mary and the saints by Giovanni Bernardino Azzolini and the main altar, which dates from the 18th century.

Legend has it that the church contains the tomb of Lisa del Giocondo, the subject of the Mona Lisa, who died at Lagonegro in 1506.

See also 

 List of cathedrals in Italy

References

External links 
Official website of the diocese of Tursi-Lagonegro 
Description of the cathedral on gcatholic.org 

Cathedral
Lagonegro
Buildings and structures completed in the 10th century
Cathedrals in Basilicata